The Derwent Valley Railway was a branch railway in County Durham, England.

Background
In 1842, the Derwent Iron Company (DIC) had taken over the southern part of the former Stanhope and Tyne Railway. As a result, the DIC proposed an extension from Crook to the foot of the Meeting Slacks incline, which latter became , to provide a southern shipping route for their lime and iron products. Having obtained an extension of their right of way from the Bishop of Durham, the DIC submitted the plans to the S&DR, who agreed to the extension as long as the DIC leased the entire southern section of the former S&TR to them.

After the opening of the Weardale Extension Railway and the completion of Hownes Gill Viaduct under Thomas Bouch in 1858, the DIC had pressed the newly formed NER to link  with the River Tyne via Gateshead.

History
Constructed as an extension of the existing Lanchester Valley Railway, the Lanchester Railway Extension as it was originally known was opened in 1867 after three years’ building work. The Nine Arches Viaduct was one of the major engineering feats of the railway.

At its peak in 1914 the railway was carrying over half a million passengers a year with a regular goods traffic of timber, bricks and coal to Newcastle and iron ore to Consett.

The railway is notable for an unsolved murder that occurred at Lintz Green railway station. The stationmaster, George Wilson, met his death on the night of 7 October 1911. No satisfactory explanation was ever forthcoming despite one of the most intensive murder investigations ever carried out in the North East of England.

High Westwood Station was closed in 1942 while the remaining stations survived into the 1950s. The line finally closed on 11 November 1963.

The railway is commemorated in the Geordie folk song about an ill-fated train journey from Rowlands Gill, Wor Nanny's a mazer.

Present and Future
Durham County Council have since developed the route into a multi-user path and Gateshead Council into the Derwent Walk country park, part of the Sustrans network of national foot and cycle paths. The viaducts and bridges were repaired and the entire trackbed, with the exception of a small section through Rowlands Gill where the cutting was infilled, has now become a section of the Sea to Sea Cycle Route.

In June 2020, MP for North West Durham, Richard Holden, sponsored a bid to the Ideas Fund of the Department for Transport's Restoring Your Railway Fund, hoping to access up to £50,000 to cover the cost of an initial study into the feasibility of restoring a rail link between Consett and Blaydon.

References

External links
Lanchester Railway Extension @ RailBrit.co.uk

North Eastern Railway (UK)
Closed railway lines in North East England
Rail transport in County Durham
Rail transport in Tyne and Wear
Railway lines opened in 1867
Railway lines closed in 1963